Cnecidophora is a genus of moths of the family Tortricidae.

Species
Cnecidophora ochroptila (Meyrick, 1910)

See also
List of Tortricidae genera

References

External links
tortricidae.com

Tortricidae genera
Taxa named by Marianne Horak
Olethreutinae